The 1965 Boston Patriots season was the franchise's 6th season in the American Football League. The Patriots ended the season with a record of four wins and eight losses and two ties, and finished third in the AFL's Eastern Division.

Staff

Game-by-game results

Standings

Roster

References

Boston Patriots
New England Patriots seasons
Boston Patriots
1960s in Boston